Bernadette O'Rourke (also known as Bernie O'Rourke) is an Irish linguist from County Clare. She is currently Professor of Sociolinguistics and Hispanic Studies at the University of Glasgow and is a specialist in the construction of difference through language and social inequalities. Her research focuses on "neophones" or new speakers of minority languages such as Irish Gaelic and Galician. She has also published and commented on the assumptions of monolinguism in Great Britain, particularly in the context of Brexit, public policy related to minority languages in Ireland, the UK, and Europe.

Career 
O'Rourke has taught at the Universidade da Corunha, Dublin City University, NUI Galway and Heriot-Watt University where she has taught Spanish and Sociolinguisitcs. In addition to expertise in Irish Gaelic and Galician, O'Rourke has also promoted the support of Gaelic education in Scotland.

Publications

Books 

 O'Rourke, Bernadette and J. Walsh. New Speakers of Irish in the Global Context. New Revival?. Routledge, 2020. ISBN 9781138243385.
 O'Rourke, Bernadette. Galician and Irish in the European Context: Attitudes Toward Weak and Strong Minority Languages. Palgrave Macmillan: New York, 2011. ISBN 780230574038

Selected journal articles 

 O'Rourke, B. and Nandi, A. (2019) New speaker parents as grassroots policy makers in contemporary Galicia: ideologies, management and practices. Language Policy, 18(4), pp. 493-511. doi: 10.1007/s10993-018-9498-y
 Brennan, S. and O'Rourke, B. (2019) Commercialising the cúpla focal: New speakers, language ownership, and the promotion of Irish as a business resource. Language in Society, 48(1), pp. 125-145. doi: 10.1017/S0047404518001148
International Journal of the Sociology of Language, 2015(231), pp. 1-20.
 O'Rourke, B. and Walsh, J. (2015) New speakers of Irish: shifting boundaries across time and space. International Journal of the Sociology of Language, 2015(231), pp. 63-83.
 O'Rourke, B. and Ramallo, F. (2013) Competing ideologies of linguistic authority amongst new speakers in contemporary Galicia. Language in Society, 42(3), pp. 287-305. doi: 10.1017/S0047404513000249
 O'Rourke, B. and Pujolar, J. (2013) From native speakers to “new speakers”: problematizing nativeness in language revitalization contexts. Histoire Épistémologie Langage, 35(2), pp. 47-67.
 O'Rourke, B. (2011) Whose language is it? Struggles for language ownership in an Irish language classroom. Journal of Language, Identity and Education, 10(5), pp. 327-345. doi: 10.1080/15348458.2011.614545

References

External links 
 Faculty page, University of Glasgow

Living people
Year of birth missing (living people)
Linguists from Ireland
Women linguists
People associated with Heriot-Watt University
Alumni of Dublin City University
Academics of the University of Glasgow